Wade is a surname of Anglo-Saxon English origin. It is thought to derive from the Middle English given name "Wade," which itself derived from the pre-7th century Old English verb "wadan" (wada) meaning "to go", or as a habitational name from the Old English word "(ge)waed" meaning "ford".

Origins and variants 

The given name Wade, from which the surname may be derived, was first recorded in the "little" Domesday Book for Norfolk, Suffolk, and Essex in 1086 as "Wada", "Wade" and "Wado", owing its popularity to the legend of Wade, a sea-giant, who was dreaded and honored by the coastal tribes of the North Sea and the Baltic Sea.
The first recording of Wade as a surname is from this source. The Old English word "(ge)waed" meaning "ford," may either be a topographical name to denote someone who lived by a ford, or a locational name from a place known as Wade, such as "Wade" in the county of Suffolk in East Anglia in the East of England. The surname is historically concentrated in the East of England, particularly in and around the counties of Suffolk and Essex, suggesting that this region may be the surname's likely area of origin.

The first recorded spelling of the surname as "Wade" specifically, is shown to be that of Godwin Wade, dated 1166 in the "Pipe Rolls of Essex", during the reign of King Henry II (1154–1189).

The official use of surnames became necessary when governments introduced personal taxation. Until the gradual standardization of English spelling in the last few centuries, English lacked any comprehensive system of spelling. Consequently, spelling variations in names are frequently found in early Anglo-Saxon and later Anglo-Norman documents, meaning that a person's name was often spelled several different ways over a lifetime. As such, different variations of the Wade surname usually have the same origin.

Variants of this surname include Waide and Wadey, the latter a diminutive variant.  There is also a documented relationship between Wade and Waythe, the latter derived by a variant form of "wade" meaning a ford, that being "wath"; there is likewise a relationship between Wade/Waythe and Ford/Forth.

Wade in Ireland 

The Wade surname also spread throughout the rest of the British Isles, and this is evidenced by its presence in many medieval manuscripts in Ireland, Scotland and Wales. In Ireland, the name is of English, Gaelic and Norman French origin, having been spread throughout the islands by Norman French settlers in the 13th century (De la Wade), and English settlers, particularly in the 17th century. The name was then gaelicized in many cases, becoming MacWade, MacUaid, MacQuaid and Quaid.

Notable people and fictional characters with the surname

A to E 
Abdoulaye Wade (born 1926), President of Senegal

April Wade, American actress and producer
Arthur C. Wade (1852–1914), American lawyer and politician
Arthur Edward Wade (1895-1989), British botanist, lichenologist and museum curator
Barrington Wade (born 1998), American football player
Ben Wade (1922–2002), American baseball player

Bernie L. Wade (born 1963), American minister, President of the International Circle of Faith

Betsy Wade (1929-2020), American journalist
Brandon Wade (born 1970), American businessman
Bryan Wade (born 1963), English footballer

Christian Wade (born 1991), English rugby player & American football player
Claude Martin Wade (1794–1861), British political officer in India and Afghanistan
Cory Wade (born 1983), American Major League Baseball player

Dallas Toler-Wade (born 1974), American musician
Dean Wade (born 1996), American basketball player
Don Wade (1928–2007), American football coach and college athletics administrator
Donald Wade, Baron Wade (1904–1988), British Liberal Party politician
Doug Wade (born 1941), former Australian rules footballer
Dwyane Wade (born 1982), American basketball player

Edward Wade (1802–1866), American politician

F to J
Gale Wade (1929-2022), American baseball player
George Wade (1673–1748) was a British military commander

Henry Wade (1914–2001), Texas lawyer and lead defendant in Roe v. Wade
 Henry Wade, pen name of British mystery writer Sir Henry Aubrey-Fletcher, 6th Baronet (1887–1969)
Henry Wade (surgeon) (1876–1955), Scottish surgeon
Herbert Wade (doctor) (1886–1968), American doctor and researcher on leprosy
Herby Wade (1905–1980), South African cricketer

James Wade (born 1983), English darts player

Jason Wade (born 1980), singer/songwriter
Jennie Wade (1843–1863), the only civilian casualty in the Battle of Gettysburg
Jeremy Wade (born 1956), British TV presenter (River Monsters) and fishing author
Jessey Wade ( – 1952), English suffragette and animal welfare campaigner
Jim Wade (1925–2019), American football player

John Wade, several people
Joivan Wade (born 1993), British actor

Julian Wade (born 1990), Dominican footballer
Julie Marie Wade (born 1979), American writer and professor or writing

K to O
LaMonte Wade Jr. (born 1994), American baseball player
Lillian Wade (1870–1923), British sculptor
Lloyd Wade, English gospel and soul singer, vocal coach
Logan Wade (born 1991), Australian baseball player
Mark Wade (born 1965), American retired basketball player

Martin Joseph Wade (1861–1931), U.S. Democratic Representative from Iowa
Mary Wade (1775–1859), One of the youngest female convicts transported to Australia aboard the Lady Juliana in 1790 and 5x great grandmother of former Australian Prime Minister, Kevin Rudd.
Mary Hazelton Blanchard Wade (1860–1936), American writer
Mary Wade (paleontologist) (1928–2005), Australian paleontologist
Matthew Wade (born 1987), Australian cricketer

Morgan Wade (singer) (1995-), American singer
Ned Wade (hurler) (1911–1992), Irish hurler
Nicholas Wade (born 1942 in England), US science writer and author
Nicholas J. Wade British vision researcher and historian of vision
Oulton Wade, Baron Wade of Chorlton (1932–2018), British politician and businessman

P to T
Paul Wade (born 1962), retired Australian footballer
Peter Wade, British anthropologist
Rachel Wade (born 1990), American murderer
Rebekah Wade, English journalist
Reg Wade, English footballer
Robert Wade (disambiguation), multiple people
Rosalind Wade (1909–1989), British novelist
Scott Wade (born 1960), former Australian rules footballer
Ted Wade (disambiguation), multiple people
Shaun Wade (disambiguation), multiple people
Sidney Wade (born 1951), American poet
Stephen Wade (Born 1960), Australian politician
Silas A. Wade (1797–1869), American politician
Terence Wade (1930–2005), English academic and linguist
Thomas Wade (disambiguation), multiple people
Tyler Wade (born 1994), American baseball player

U to Z
Virginia Wade (born 1945), tennis player from the United Kingdom
Wallace Wade (1892–1986), American college sports coach
Wayne Wade (born 1959), Jamaican reggae musician

Willoughby Francis Wade (1827–1906), British physician

Notes

Further reading

See also 
 Justice Wade (disambiguation)

English-language surnames